Naike Rivelli (born 10 October 1974) is an Italian actress and singer.

Biography
Rivelli is the eldest daughter of actress Ornella Muti. For many years, she believed Spanish film producer José Luis Bermúdez de Castro was her father; following a DNA test requested by him, the two found they were not related, and her mother later declared that she did not know the identity of Naike's father.

In 1996, Rivelli gave birth to Akash, the result of a brief relationship. In 2002 Rivelli married the German actor Manou Lubowski; the marriage lasted nine months and, after the separation, they divorced in 2008. Regarding her sexual orientation, at the beginning of the year 2010, she revealed her bisexuality.

Selected filmography
 The Count of Monte Cristo (1998, TV miniseries), as young Mercédès Igualada
 The Unscarred (2000), as young Rafaella
 South Kensington (2001), as Ilaria
  (2002, TV film), as Sharon
 Open Graves (2009), as Elena

References

External links
 
 Naike Rivelli's web page

1974 births
Living people
Actresses from Munich
Bisexual actresses
Italian female models
Italian women singers
Italian film actresses
Italian people of Estonian descent
Italian people of Baltic German descent
Italian people of Russian descent
Italian television actresses
Italian bisexual people
Italian LGBT actors
20th-century Italian actresses
21st-century Italian actresses